Prado Dam is an earth-fill dry dam across the Santa Ana River at the Chino Hills near Corona, California in Riverside County with the resulting impounded water creating Prado Flood Control Basin reservoir. The U.S. Army Corps of Engineers built the dam in Lower Santa Ana River Canyon. The area upstream from the dam contains  of the watershed's . The dam's construction was authorized in 1936 and the flood of 1938 demonstrated its necessity. Construction was completed in 1941. Prado Flood Control Basin also provides water storage for groundwater recharge operations.

Failure threat
On January 14, 2005, after days of heavy rain, water began seeping through an earthen extension. Authorities released water in order to relieve pressure and sent a flood warning to areas downriver of the dam. Over 3,000 residents were evacuated from their homes for nearly twenty-four hours for fear of flooding. The gymnasium at Corona High School was converted by the American Red Cross into a temporary shelter.

Upgrades 
The total costs of the improvements is estimated at $400 million.

See also
 List of dams and reservoirs in California
 List of largest reservoirs of California

References

External links

U.S. Army Corps of Engineers – Prado Dam
U.S. Army Corps of Engineers– Seven Oaks Dam

Historic American Engineering Record (HAER) documentation, filed under Santa Ana River near junction of State Highways 71 and 91, Corona, Riverside County, CA:

Dams in California
Historic American Engineering Record in California
Buildings and structures in Riverside County, California
Santa Ana River
Earth-filled dams
United States Army Corps of Engineers dams
Dams completed in 1941